Tawih bin Abdullah (born 9 June 1964) is a former Bruneian soldier and the 9th Commander of the Royal Brunei Armed Forces (RBAF) who serves from 2014 until 2018.

Education
From January until December 1984, he underwent training at the Officer Cadet School, Portsea, Australia. Throughout his career, he was sent to several training institutes which include the Platoon Commander Course at Army Combat Training Centre (PULADA), Johor Bahru, Malaysia in 1985, Royal School of Military Engineering, Kent, England, from 1987 until 1988, Company Tactic Course and Battalion Tactic Course in Singapore and the Intermediate Operation Course at the Land Warfare Centre, Canungra, Australia, Command and Staff Course at the Malaysian Armed Forces Staff College, Kuala Lumpur, Malaysia, in 1997, Australian Centre for Defence and Strategic Studies (ACDSS) at Weston Creek, Canberra, Australia in 2007 and obtained a Master of Arts (MA) in Strategic studies from Deakin University, Australia.

Military career
On 6 December 1982, he enlisted as a potential officer cadet in the RBAF and later underwent basic training at the Recruit Training Centre, Bolkiah Camp. Appointed as an officer cadet after training completion on 1 July 1983. Upon completing his training at the Officer Cadet School in Australia, he was promoted to second lieutenant. He was later assigned as the Rifle Platoon Commander with 'D' Company 1st Battalion RBLF. Pehin Tawih became an Engineer Field Troop Commander in 1986 and he would then be upgraded to a captain in 1990.

Pehin Tawih holds the position of a Staff Officer Grade 3 G1 and Company Commander of Command Company 2nd Battalion RBLF, respectively in 1990 and from 1993 until 1996. He became a major in 1994, and a Staff Officer Grade 2 to the RBAF commander from 1998 before being redirected to Operations and Training at Headquarters RBLF in 1999. From 2000 until 2001, he was the deputy commander of the 3rd Battalion RBLF before being the commander of the same battalion until 2003.

In 2002, Pehin Tawih was promoted to a lieutenant colonel and assigned to the Directorate of Operations Ministry of Defence as Staff Officer Grade 1 Operations from 2003 until 2005. The title of Yang Dimuliakan Pehin Datu Pekerma Jaya was bestowed to him with the consent of Sultan Hassanal Bolkiah in 2004. He was assigned to the Director of Personnel at the Ministry of Defence in early 2006 and became the Acting Deputy Commander of RBLF in February of that same year. In October 2008, he was promoted to the rank of colonel and became commander of Training Institute RBAF. He achieved the rank of brigadier general on 25 May 2011.

On 30 January 2014, He succeeded Aminuddin Ihsan and became the 9th Commander of the RBAF. In 2016, Edmundo R. Pangilinan, commander of the 6th Infantry Division, welcomed Mohammad Tawih and Police Commissioner Mohammad Jammy at the Cotabato Airport, Maguindanao, Philippines. They were making an annual visit to Brunei UN peacekeepers in Mindanao. Few days later on 31 January 2018, Pehin Tawih officially retires from military service and his position succeeded by Aminan Mahmud. Commander of U.S. Pacific Command, Admiral Harry B. Harris Jr. awarded the Legion of Merit to Pehin Tawih at the residence of U.S. Ambassador Craig B. Allen on 21 February 2018.

Personal life
Mohammad Tawih is married to Zulia binti Basman and has four children together. He enjoys playing association football and golf.

Honours

National 

  The Most Gallant Order of Pahlawan Negara Brunei First Class (PSPNB) – Dato Seri Pahlawan (15 July 2010)
  Order of Paduka Keberanian Laila Terbilang First Class (DPKT) – Dato Paduka Seri
  Order of Seri Paduka Mahkota Brunei Third Class (SMB)
  Golden Jubilee Medal – (5 October 2017)
  Silver Jubilee Medal – (5 October 1992)
  General Service Medal
  Long Service Medal (Armed Forces)
  Royal Brunei Armed Forces Silver Jubilee Medal – (31 May 1986)
  Royal Brunei Armed Forces Golden Jubilee Medal – (31 May 2011)

Foreign 

 :
  Legion of Merit – (21 February 2018)

 :
  Darjah Utama Bakti Cemerlang (DUBC) – (21 April 2015)

 :
  Order of the Crown of Thailand Second Class (KCT)

 :
  Order of Military Service Courageous Commander (PGAT)

 :
  Bintang Yudha Dharma Utama (BYD)

References

1964 births
Living people 
Bruneian military leaders